A paradise is a religious concept of an idealized place.

Paradise may also refer to:

Films and television

Feature films
 Paradise (1926 film), a film starring Betty Bronson and Milton Sills
 Paradise (1928 film), a film by Denison Clift and starring Betty Balfour
 Paradise (1932 film), a film by Guido Brignone
 Paradise (1955 film), a Swedish film by 	Arne Ragneborn
 Paradise (1975 film), a film by Bill Hughes
 Paradise (1982 film), a film starring Phoebe Cates and Willie Aames
 Paradise (1984 film), am animated short film by Ishu Patel
 Paradise (1991 film), a film starring Melanie Griffith and Don Johnson
 Paradise, a 2004 film by Roger Steinmann
 Paradise (2011 film), a film by Ulrich Seidl
 Paradise (2013 film), a film by Diablo Cody
 Paradise (2016 film), a film by Andrei Konchalovsky

Television series
 Paradise (American TV series), a 1988–1991 American Western family television series, also known as Guns of Paradise
 Paradise (Spanish TV series), a 2021 Spanish television series
 Paradise Beach, a 1993–1994 Australian television series that aired on Nine
 The Paradise (TV series), a 2012–2013 BBC television drama

Television episodes
 "Paradise" (Criminal Minds) (2008)
 "Paradise" (The Outer Limits) (1996)
 "Paradise" (Star Trek: Deep Space Nine) (1994)

Literature
 Paradise (Barthelme novel), a 1986 novel by Donald Barthelme
 Paradise (Dante), part of the 14th-century Divine Comedy
 Paradise (Gurnah novel), a 1994 historical novel
 Paradise (Morrison novel), a 1997 novel by Toni Morrison
 Paradyzja or Paradise, a science fiction novel by Janusz A. Zajdel
 Paradise, a 1913 novel by Alice Brown
 Paradise, a 1991 novel by Elena Castedo
 Paradise, a 1937 novel by Esther Forbes
 Paradise, a 1925 novel by Cosmo Hamilton
 Paradise, a fantasy novel by Koji Suzuki
 Paradise, Ohio, a fictional place in the I Am Number Four series by Pittacus Lore
 Paradise, Massachusetts, a fictional place in the Jesse Stone novels by Robert B. Parker and Michael Brandman

Music

Bands 
 Paradise (British band), a London Gospel quintet of the early 1980s
 Paradise (Hmong band), a Hmong-American pop band started in 1989

Albums 
 Paradise (A-Reece album) (2016)
 Paradise (John Anderson album) (1996)
 Paradise (Anohni EP) (2017)
 Paradise (Kaci Battaglia album) (2001)
 Paradise (Peabo Bryson album) (1980)
 Paradise (By2 album) (2013)
 Paradise (Lana Del Rey EP) (2012)
 Paradise (Leroy Hutson album) (1982)
 Paradise (Inner City album) (1989)
 Paradise (The Insyderz EP) (1998)
 Paradise, an album by Joy and the Boy (2001)
 Paradise (Kenny G album) (2002)
 Paradise (KMFDM album) (2019)
 Paradise (Billy Lawrence album) (1997)
 Paradise (Lil Suzy album) (1997)
 Paradise (My Disco album) (2008)
 Paradise (Paint It Black album) (2005)
 Paradise (Pirates of the Mississippi album) (1995)
 Paradise (Cody Simpson album) (2012)
 Paradise (Bob Sinclar album) (1998)
 Paradise (Slow Club album) (2011)
 Paradise (Stars album) (1977)
 Paradise (TQ album) (2008)
 Paradise (Ruby Turner album) (1989)
 Paradise (Grover Washington Jr. album) (1979)
 Paradise (White Lung album) (2016)

Songs 
 "Paradise" (1931 song), a song by Nacio Herb Brown
 "Paradise" (Alan Walker, K-391, Boy In Space song) (2021)
 "Paradise" (Aztec Camera song) (1987)
 "Paradise" (Bazzi song) (2019)
 "Paradise" (Bee Gees song) (1981)
 "Paradise" (Benny Benassi and Chris Brown song) (2016)
 "Paradise" (Big Sean song) (2014)
 "Paradise" (Black song) (1988)
 "Paradise" (Chris Brown song) (2017)
 "Paradise" (Change song) (1981)
 "Paradise" (Charli XCX song) (2016)
 "Paradise" (Coldplay song) (2011)
 "Paradise" (E-Type & Nana Hedin song) (2004)
 "Paradise" (George Ezra song) (2018)
 "Paradise" (Hello Venus song) (2016)
 "Paradise" (John Anderson song) (1995)
 "Paradise" (John Prine song) (1971)
 "Paradise" (Khalid song) (2019)
 "Paradise" (LL Cool J song) (2002), featuring Amerie
 "Paradise" (Meduza song) (2020) 
 "Paradise" (Ofenbach song) (2018), featuring Benjamin Ingrosso
 "Paradise" (Phoebe Cates song) (1982)
 "Paradise" (Sade song) (1988)
 "Paradise" (Styx song) (1997)
 "Paradise" (The Temptations song) (1962)
 "Paradise" (What About Us?), a 2013 song by Within Temptation
 "Paradise", a song written by Harry Nilsson and recorded by The Ronettes and The Shangri-Las in the 1960s
 "Paradise", a song by Alcazar from Casino
 "Paradise", a song by Lynn Anderson from All the King's Horses
 "Paradise", a song by Jimmy Barnes from Bodyswerve
 "Paradise", a song by The Boo Radleys from Everything's Alright Forever
 "Paradise", a song by Beyond from Second Floor
 "Paradise", a song by Boyzone from A Different Beat
 "Paradise", a song by Jeremy Camp from Reckless
 "Paradise", a song by Vanessa Carlton from Be Not Nobody
 "Paradise", a song by John Denver from Rocky Mountain High
 "Paradise", a song by Jackie DeShannon from Jackie
 "Paradise", a song by Faith Evans from Incomparable
 "Paradise", a song by Fergie from the deluxe edition version of the album The Dutchess
 "Paradise", a song by John Fogerty from The Blue Ridge Rangers Rides Again
 "Paradise", a song by Ellie Goulding from Delirium
 "Paradise", a song by The Insyderz from Paradise EP
 "Paradise", a song by Iron Savior from Condition Red
 "Paradise", a song by Lil Uzi Vert from Luv Is Rage
 "Paradise (Not for Me)", a song by Madonna from Music
 "Paradise", a song by McAuley Schenker Group from M.S.G.
 "Paradise", a song by Mýa from Sugar & Spice
 "Paradise", a song by New Order from Brotherhood
 "Paradise", a song by Diana Ross from Workin' Overtime
 "Paradise", a song by The Saints from The Monkey Puzzle
 "Paradise", a song by Bruce Springsteen from The Rising
 "Paradise", a song by The Stranglers from Feline
 "Paradise", a song by Stratovarius from Visions
 "Paradise", a song by T-Max from the Korean television series Boys Over Flowers
 "Paradise", a song by Timmy T from Time After Time
 "Paradise", a song by Tove Lo from Truth Serum
 "Paradise", a song by Jolin Tsai from J1 Live Concert
 "Paradise", a song by Uriah Heep from Demons and Wizards
 "Paradise", a song by Vincent from Lucky Thirteen (2007)
 "Paradise", a song by Dwight Yoakam from the compilation album Dwight's Used Records

Places

Australia
 Paradise, Queensland, a ghost town now inundated by Lake Paradise
 Paradise, South Australia, a suburb of Adelaide
 Paradise, Tasmania, a locality in the Kentish Council area

Canada
 Paradise, Newfoundland and Labrador
 Paradise, Nova Scotia

Grenada
 Paradise, Grenada

Guyana
 Paradise, Guyana

New Zealand
 Paradise, New Zealand

Suriname
 Paradise, Suriname

United Kingdom
 Paradise, Birmingham, in the West Midlands
Paradise, Gloucestershire
 Paradise, Tyne and Wear, in North East England

United States
 Paradise, Arizona
 Paradise, California, an incorporated town in Butte County
 Shively, California or Paradise, an unincorporated community
 Paradise, Mono County, California
 Paradise, Florida
 Paradise, Illinois
 Paradise, Indiana
 Paradise, Kansas
 Paradise, Kentucky
 Paradise, Michigan
 Paradise, Missouri
 Paradise, Montana
 Paradise, Nevada
 Paradise, Ohio
 Paradise, Oregon
 Paradise, Pennsylvania
 Paradise, Texas
 Paradise, Utah
 Paradise, Washington
 Paradise Ice Caves, a system of interconnected glacier caves within Mount Rainier's Paradise Glacier, Washington, U.S.
 Paradise, West Virginia
 Paradise Township (disambiguation)
 Paradise, U.S. Virgin Islands

Sports
 Paradise (synchronized skating team), a synchronized skating team from Russia
 Paradise FC International, a football club from Grenada
 Celtic Park or Paradise, home of Celtic F.C.
 Celtic Park (Belfast) or Paradise, former home of Belfast Celtic F.C.

Visual arts
 Il Paradiso or Paradise (c. 1588), a painting by Tintoretto that is reputedly the largest painting ever done on canvas
 Paradise (c. 1620), a painting by Jan Brueghel the Younger

Other uses
 Paradise (cocktail), an IBA official cocktail, made with gin and brandy
 Paradise (nightclub), a gay nightclub in Asbury Park, New Jersey, U.S.
 Paradise (surname)
 Paradise (Warrenton, Virginia), a historic house
 Paradise (video game), a 2006 computer adventure game
 Carnival Paradise, a 1998 cruise ship owned by Carnival Cruise Lines
 Nexor Paradise (Piloting a Research Directory in an OSI Environment), an X.500 directory project
 Paradise garden, a form of garden
 Paradise Papers, a set of 13.4 million confidential documents relating to offshore investments, released in 2017

See also